Nour El Tayeb (born March 8, 1993, in Cairo) is a professional squash player who represents Egypt. She reached a career-high world ranking of three in March, 2018.

Career
The highlight of her junior career was, at age sixteen, reaching the final of the World Juniors in 2009, beating top seed Dipika Pallikal on the way before losing to fellow Egyptian Nour El Sherbini.

In 2012, she was part of the team that regained the world team title after winning a gold medal at the 2012 Women's World Team Squash Championships.

In 2014, she was part of the Egyptian team that won the bronze medal at the 2014 Women's World Team Squash Championships.

In 2018, she was part of the Egyptian team that won the 2018 Women's World Team Squash Championships. In 2022, she was part of the Egyptian team that won the 2022 Women's World Team Squash Championships. It was her third world team title.

Squash achievements 
Winner – WISPA Young Player of the Year 2010 
Winner – Internationaux De Creteil, Paris, France
Winner – British Junior Open U13, U15, U17, and U19
Winner – Pioneer U11 and U13
Winner – First National Championships U11 and U15
Winner - World Junior Champion 2011

Major World Series final appearances

Hong Kong Open: 1 final (0 title, 1 runner-up)

U.S. Open: 2 final (1 title, 1 runner-up)

Malaysian Open: 1 final (0 title, 1 runner-up)

Personal life
She is married to fellow squash professional Ali Farag, and the pair set a new record, becoming the first married couple to both win a major title on the same day after winning the US Open in 2017. She retired on December 7, 2020, on announcing her first pregnancy.

References

External links 

1993 births
Living people
Egyptian female squash players
21st-century Egyptian women